The 2022 Rhode Island Rams baseball team represents the University of Rhode Island during the 2022 NCAA Division I baseball season. The Rams play their home games at Bill Beck Field as a member of the Atlantic 10 Conference They are led by head coach Raphael Cerrato, in his eighth year as manager.

Previous season

The 2021 team won the Northern Division championship, obtaining a record of 28–26–1 (13–6) before losing in the semifinal round of the 2021 Atlantic 10 Conference baseball tournament. They did not earn an at-large bid into the NCAA tournament.

Tournaments

Atlantic 10 tournament

References

External links 
 URI Baseball

Rhode Island Rams baseball seasons
Rhode Island Rams
Rhode Island Rams